2-Furoic acid is an organic compound, consisting of a furan ring and a carboxylic acid side-group. Along with other furans, its name is derived from the Latin word furfur, meaning bran, from which these compounds were first produced. The salts and esters of furoic acids are known as furoates. 2-Furoic acid is most widely encountered in food products as a preservative and a flavouring agent, where it imparts a sweet, earthy flavour.

History
The compound was first described by Carl Wilhelm Scheele in 1780, who obtained it by the dry distillation of mucic acid. For this reason it was initially known as pyromucic acid. This was the first known synthesis of a furan compound, the second being furfural in 1821.
Despite this, it was furfural which came to set naming conventions for later furans.

Preparation and synthesis

2-Furoic acid can be synthesized by the oxidation of either furfuryl alcohol or furfural. This can be achieved either chemically or biocatalytically. 

The current industrial route involves the Cannizaro reaction of furfural in an aqueous NaOH solution. This is a disproportionation reaction and produces a 1:1 ratio of 2-furoic acid and furfuryl alcohol (a 50% yield of each). It remains economical because both products have commercial value. The bio-catalytic route involves the microorganism Nocardia corallina. This produces 2-furoic acid in higher yields: 98% from 2-furfuryl alcohol and 88% from 2-furfural, but has yet to be commercialised.

Applications and occurrences

In terms of commercial uses, 2-furoic acid is often used in the production of furoate esters, some of which are drugs and pesticides.

In foods
It is a flavoring ingredient and achieved a generally recognized as safe (GRAS) status in 1995 by the Flavor and Extract Manufacturers Association (FEMA). 2-Furoic acid has a distinct odor described as sweet, oily, herbaceous, and earthy. 

2-Furoic acid helps sterilize and pasteurize many foods. It forms in situ from 2-furfural. 2-Furoic acid is also formed during coffee roasting, with up to 205 mg/kg.

Optic properties
2-Furoic acid crystals are highly transparent in the 200–2000 nm wavelength region, are stable up to 130 °C, and generally have low absorption in the UV, visible, and IR ranges. In optical and dielectric studies, 2-furoic acid crystals may act as paraelectrics in the temperature range < 318 K and ferroelectrics in temperature ranges > 318 K.

Microbial metabolism
2-Furoic acid can be the sole source of carbon and energy for the organism Pseudomonas putida. The organism aerobically degrades the compound.

Hazards
The LD50 is 100 mg/kg (oral, rats).

References

Further reading
 
 

Reagents for organic chemistry
Aromatic acids
2-Furyl compounds